Ray Greene (February 2, 1765January 11, 1849) was a United States senator and Attorney General from Rhode Island during the early days of statehood.

Life

Born in Warwick, Rhode Island, Greene was a son of William Greene Jr. and Catharine Ray.  His father was a governor of Rhode Island during the American Revolutionary War, and his mother was a correspondent of Benjamin Franklin.  Greene pursued classical studies and graduated from Yale College in 1784, then studied law, was admitted to the bar, and commenced practice in Providence. He was attorney general of Rhode Island from 1794 to 1797, and in the latter year was elected as a Federalist to the United States Senate to fill the vacancy caused by the resignation of William Bradford. Greene was reelected in 1799 and in total served from November 13, 1797, to March 5, 1801, when he resigned, having been nominated for a judicial position. He was designated a district judge of Rhode Island by President John Adams, but, through a technicality, was not appointed.

Greene died in Warwick in 1849, and he, his wife Mary, and his son William are all buried in the Governor Greene Cemetery on Love Lane in Warwick, where Greene's father and grandfather (both governors) are also buried.

Family

Greene married in Charleston, South Carolina on July 23, 1794 Mary Magdalene Flagg (1775–1817), the daughter of George Flagg and Mary Magdalene Henderson of Charleston.  The couple had five children, the oldest of whom was George Turner Greene (1795–1821) followed by William Greene III who became a Lieutenant Governor of Rhode Island in the late 1860s.  Their third child, Catharine Ray Greene (1799–1875) married in 1815 Dr. James Varnum Turner; Mary Elizabeth (born 1804) died as a youngster; and Isabella Mary (1805–1863) married in 1833 Joseph S. Jenckes.

Ancestry 

Greene's grandfather was colonial governor William Greene Sr., and both his father and mother, who were second cousins, descend from early colonial deputy governor John Greene Jr.  Ray Greene also descends from several early Rhode Island settlers, including Warwick founders John Greene Sr., Samuel Gorton, and Randall Holden, and Providence founder Roger Williams.

References

External links
Greene family of Rhode Island

1765 births
1849 deaths
Politicians from Warwick, Rhode Island
American people of English descent
Rhode Island Federalists
Federalist Party United States senators from Rhode Island
Rhode Island Attorneys General
Yale College alumni
Burials in Rhode Island
Greene family of Rhode Island